Through With You is the third studio album by Slave Unit, released on April 8, 2014 by WTII Records.

Track listing

Personnel
Adapted from the Through With You liner notes.

Slave Unit
 Shawn Brice – guitar, percussion, cover art, illustrations
 Aki Sasaki – bass guitar, percussion
 Mike Welch – lead vocals, programming, guitar, bass guitar, percussion, production

Production and design
 Jason Bazinet – production
 Chris Demarcus – production, mixing, mastering
 Ann Welch – photography

Release history

References

External links 
 Through With You at Bandcamp
 

2014 albums
Slave Unit albums